The men's 200 metres at the 2015 World Championships in Athletics was held at the Beijing National Stadium on 25, 26 and 27 August.

Records
Prior to the competition, the records were as follows:

Qualification standards

Schedule

Results

Heats
Qualification: First 3 in each heat (Q) and the next 3 fastest (q) advanced to the semifinals.

Semifinals
Qualification: First 2 in each heat (Q) and the next 2 fastest (q) advanced to the final.

Final
The final was held at 20:55.

References

200
200 metres at the World Athletics Championships